Bryn Williams-Jones (born 1972) is a Canadian bioethicist, professor and Director of the Department of Social and Preventive Medicine at the School of Public Health, Université de Montréal. He is co-founder and editor-in-chief of the Canadian Journal of Bioethics/Revue canadienne de bioéthique, the first open access bilingual bioethics journal in Canada (formerly called BioéthiqueOnline, 2012–17), and co-director of the Ethics branch of the International Observatory on the Social Impact of AI and Digital Technology (OBVIA). Williams-Jones is a member of the Centre for Research in Public Health (CReSP), the Centre for Ethics Research (CRÉ), the Institute for Applied Ethics (IDÉA) of the Université Laval, and Fellow of the The Hastings Center.

Education
An interdisciplinary scholar, Williams-Jones completed a bachelor's degree in Philosophy and then a Masters in Religious Studies (bioethics specialization) at McGill University, before pursuing his PhD in Interdisciplinary studies (bioethics) at the W. Maurice Young Centre for Applied Ethics at the University of British Columbia, where he focused on issues of genetics and ethics. He then did a post-doctoral fellowship at the Centre for Family Research, University of Cambridge, and was a junior research fellow at Homerton College. Before taking up his current position as professor at the Université de Montréal, he worked for a year as a research ethicist at the Cardiff Institute of Society, Health and Ethics, Cardiff University, Wales.

Research
Williams-Jones is interested in the socio-ethical and policy implications of health innovations in diverse contexts. His work examines the conflicts that arise in academic research and professional practice with a view to developing practical ethical tools to manage these conflicts when they cannot be avoided. He has published more than 200 articles, commentaries, book chapters and case studies, on topics related to public health policy, regulation and science and technology innovation on subjects including genetics, pharmaceutical development, direct-to-consumer advertising, nanotechnology, and pharmacogenomics. He has also published on the responsible conduct of research (i.e., research integrity, research ethics), with a focus on the management of conflicts of interest.

Academic service
Williams-Jones is active in developing innovative pedagogical approaches in bioethics, professional ethics, public health ethics, and research integrity. From 2010-2022 he directed the Bioethics Program in the School of Public Health, Université de Montréal, and starting in December 2020 he became Director of the Department of Social and Preventive Medicine. He has served on university committees in the Faculty of Graduate Studies and in the School of Public Health, to develop governance initiatives to encourage the responsible conduct of research and prevent misconduct (such as plagiarism and conflicts of interest). He was a member of the top-level University research ethics committees, and has served on expert advisory committees for the Canadian Institutes of Health Research, the Social Sciences and Humanities Research Council of Canada, Genome Canada, and the Quebec National Institute for Excellence in Health and Social Services (INESSS).

Media
Williams-Jones has been interviewed by LaPresse, CBC, Le Devoir, Toronto Star, National Post, and appeared on radio and television shows such as Tout le monde en parle, ICI Radio-Canada, and CBC Newsworld.

References

Living people
1972 births
McGill University alumni
University of British Columbia alumni
Academic staff of the Université de Montréal
Canadian ethicists
Bioethicists